Filip Dewulf and Tom Vanhoudt were the defending champions, but Dewulf did not compete this year. Vanhoudt teamed up with Aleksandar Kitinov and lost in the first round to Emilio Benfele Álvarez and Hernán Gumy.

Diego Pérez and Francisco Roig won the title by defeating qualifiers Karol Kučera and Paul Wekesa 6–2, 6–4 in the final.

Seeds

Draw

Draw

References

External links
 Official results archive (ATP)
 Official results archive (ITF)

Croatia Open Umag - Doubles
1994 Doubles
1994 in Croatian tennis